Kalnadan may refer to:
 Kalnadan-e Bala
 Kalnadan-e Pain